Manur is a village in Majalgaon Taluka in the Indian state of Maharashtra. Manur is known for Renuka Devi Temple as well as Tulajabhavani Temple.

It is located only 2 km away from Majalgaon City. The Sindphana River flows through Manur Village, therefore land of manur is to be horticulture farm.

References 

Cities and towns in Beed district